Polyocha anerastiodes is a species of snout moth. It is found in Sudan.

References

 Warren, W. & Rothschild, W. 1905. Lepidoptera from the Sudan. - Novitates Zoologicae 12:21–33, pl. 4

Endemic fauna of Sudan
Anerastiini
Moths described in 1905